"A Salty Dog" is a song by the English rock band Procol Harum. Written by Gary Brooker and Keith Reid, it was released as the lead single off the band's 1969 album A Salty Dog. It was also included on the 1972 album Procol Harum Live: In Concert with the Edmonton Symphony Orchestra.

Background and composition
The song's lyrics were written by Keith Reid and its music was written by Gary Brooker when he was on tour in Switzerland; Brooker also sang. It was featured on the band's 1969 album, A Salty Dog. Reid's lyrics describe sailors crossing the unknown seas with the crew dying during their voyage. The string arrangement recalls Frédéric Chopin. The song is reportedly one of Reid's favourites.

Release and reception
"A Salty Dog" peaked at #44 on the UK Singles Chart. BBC Radio DJ John Peel explained the lack of chart success:

The song was generally well received by music critics. Matthew Greenwald of Allmusic praised the narrative as "brilliant" and carried by "an expansive melody and epic performance from the entire band". The string arrangement was "fabulous" and "only adds grandeur to the song and recording, making this one of the group's most fully realized moments". Perhaps the greatest praise came from Melody Maker's Chris Welch, who called it "their finest hour" and "one of the greatest pop singles to emerge in recent years". He added, "The tune is beautiful, the arrangement brilliant, the performance perfect".  Cash Box described it as a "stunning effort."

"A Salty Dog" is notable for not including any contributions from guitarist Robin Trower who, when the band became a quartet in 1970–71, would play bass in live performances of the song.

Chart performance

Cover versions 
The song was covered by Marc Almond on his 1986 album A Woman's Story, and by Transatlantic on the two-disc Special Edition of The Whirlwind, where it is sung by drummer Mike Portnoy.  Sarah Brightman covered the song on her 1993 album Dive. Styx covered the song on their cover album Big Bang Theory (2005) with Lawrence Gowan on lead vocals.

Notes

References

Songs with lyrics by Keith Reid
1969 singles
Procol Harum songs
Songs written by Gary Brooker
1969 songs
Regal Zonophone Records singles